The Democratic National Alliance or Democratic People's Alliance ( or DNS) is a 
centre-right political party in Republic of Srpska and Bosnia and Herzegovina. The head of the DNS is Nenad Nešić.

Electoral results

Parliamentary elections

Presidential elections

Mergers
The Alliance of National Rebirth or League of People's Rebirth (Савез Народног Препорода, Savez Narodnog Preporoda) was a conservative party led by Mirko Banjac, established in 2002, and merged into DNS in the fall of 2003. At its last legislative elections, 5 October 2002, the party won no seats in the House of Representatives of Bosnia and Herzegovina, but it won 1 out of 83 in the National Assembly of the Republic of Srpska.

Positions held
Major positions held by Democratic People's Alliance members:

References

External links
Official website

Serb nationalist parties
Conservative parties in Bosnia and Herzegovina
Political parties in Republika Srpska
Serb political parties in Bosnia and Herzegovina
Serb National Alliance (party)